John Acland Ramadhani (born Zanzibar, 1 August 1932) is a former Tanzanian Anglican archbishop. 

His grandfather was Cecil Majaliwa, the first African Anglican priest of the Universities' Mission to Central Africa.
His parents were Matthew Douglas Ramadhani and Bridget Ann Constance Masoud, both teachers.
His nephew was Augustino Ramadhani, who became Chief Justice of Tanzania-

Ramadhani completed a degree at the University of East Africa. He also gained degrees in England from Queens College, Birmingham, and the University of Birmingham.

Ramadhani was principal at St. Andrew's Teachers College, in Korogwe, from 1967 to 1969.

Ramadhani was ordained a priest in 1976 at Christ Church, Zanzibar by Mussa Kahurananga. He was warden at St. Mark's Theological College, in Dar es Salaam, from 1977 to 1979.

Ramadhani was bishop of the Diocese of Zanzibar and Tanga, from 1980 to 2001. After the diocese split, he served as interim bishop of Zanzibar until 2002, when Bishop Douglas Toto took office and Ramadhani retired.

Ramadhani was archbishop and primate of the Anglican Church of Tanzania from 1984 to 1998.

References

  

|-

 

1932 births
Living people
Anglican bishops of Zanzibar
20th-century Anglican bishops in Tanzania
20th-century Anglican archbishops
Anglican archbishops of Tanzania
Anglican bishops of Tanga